Longwood is a town in Clark County in the U.S. state of Wisconsin. The population was 698 at the 2000 census.

Geography
According to the United States Census Bureau, the town has a total area of 35.7 square miles (92.5 km2), of which, 35.7 square miles (92.5 km2) of it is land and 0.03% is water.

Demographics
As of the census of 2000, there were 698 people, 226 households, and 181 families residing in the town. The population density was 19.6 people per square mile (7.5/km2). There were 241 housing units at an average density of 6.8 per square mile (2.6/km2). The racial makeup of the town was 99.57% White, 0.14% African American, and 0.29% from two or more races. Hispanic or Latino of any race were 0.72% of the population.

There were 226 households, out of which 38.5% had children under the age of 18 living with them, 69.0% were married couples living together, 6.2% had a female householder with no husband present, and 19.9% were non-families. 16.8% of all households were made up of individuals, and 8.8% had someone living alone who was 65 years of age or older. The average household size was 3.09 and the average family size was 3.49.

In the town, the population was spread out, with 34.1% under the age of 18, 8.0% from 18 to 24, 21.1% from 25 to 44, 23.9% from 45 to 64, and 12.9% who were 65 years of age or older. The median age was 34 years. For every 100 females, there were 107.1 males. For every 100 females age 18 and over, there were 111.0 males.

The median income for a household in the town was $30,000, and the median income for a family was $33,333. Males had a median income of $26,339 versus $21,346 for females. The per capita income for the town was $13,200. About 9.8% of families and 17.8% of the population were below the poverty line, including 33.3% of those under age 18 and 6.7% of those age 65 or over.

References

Towns in Wisconsin
Towns in Clark County, Wisconsin